In mathematics, a function from a set  to a set  assigns to each element of  exactly one element of . The set  is called the domain of the function and the set  is called the codomain of the function.

Functions were originally the idealization of how a varying quantity depends on another quantity. For example, the position of a planet is a function of time. Historically, the concept was elaborated with the infinitesimal calculus at the end of the 17th century, and, until the 19th century, the functions that were considered were differentiable (that is, they had a high degree of regularity). The concept of a function was formalized at the end of the 19th century in terms of set theory, and this greatly enlarged the domains of application of the concept.

A function is uniquely represented by the set of all pairs , called the graph of the function, a popular means of illustrating the function. When the domain and the codomain are sets of real numbers, each such pair may be thought of as the Cartesian coordinates of a point in the plane.

Functions are widely used in science, engineering, and in most fields of mathematics. It has been said that functions are "the central objects of investigation" in most fields of mathematics.

Definition

The set  is called the domain of the function and the set  is called the codomain of the function.

Functions are also called maps or mappings, though some authors make some distinction between "maps" and "functions" (see ).

The domain and codomain are not always explicitly given when a function is defined, and, without some (possibly difficult) computation, one might only know that the domain is contained in a larger set. For example, a "function from the reals to the reals" may refer to a real-valued function of a real variable. However, a "function from the reals to the reals" does not mean that the domain of the function is the whole set of the real numbers, but only that the domain is a set of real numbers that contains a non-empty open interval. Such a function is then called a partial function. For example, if  is a function that has the real numbers as domain and codomain, then a function mapping the value  to the value  is a function  from the reals to the reals, whose domain is the set of the reals , such that .

The range or image of a function is the set of the images of all elements in the domain.

Total, univalent relation

Any subset of the Cartesian product of two sets  and  defines a binary relation  between these two sets. It is immediate that an arbitrary relation may contain pairs that violate the necessary conditions for a function given above.

A binary relation is univalent (also called right-unique) if

A binary relation is total if

A partial function is a binary relation that is univalent, and a function is a binary relation that is univalent and total.

Various properties of functions and function composition may be reformulated in the language of relations. For example, a function is injective if the converse relation  is univalent, where the converse relation is defined as

Set exponentiation 

The set of all functions from a set  to a set  is commonly denoted as

This notation is the same as the notation for the Cartesian product of a family of copies of  indexed by :

Notation

There are various standard ways for denoting functions. The most commonly used notation is functional notation, which is the first notation described below.

Functional notation
For example, the function which takes a real number as input and outputs that number plus 1 is denoted by

.

If a function is defined in this notation, its domain and codomain are implicitly taken to both be , the set of real numbers.

A more complicated example is the function

.

In this example, the function  takes a real number as input, squares it, then adds 1 to the result, then takes the sine of the result, and returns the final result as the output.

When the symbol denoting the function consists of several characters and no ambiguity may arise, the parentheses of functional notation might be omitted.

Functional notation was first used by Leonhard Euler in 1734. Some widely used functions are represented by a symbol consisting of several letters (usually two or three, generally an abbreviation of their name). In this case, a roman type is customarily used instead, such as "" for the sine function, in contrast to italic font for single-letter symbols.

However, distinguishing  and  can become important in cases where functions themselves serve as inputs for other functions. (A function taking another function as an input is termed a functional.) Other approaches of notating functions, detailed below, avoid this problem but are less commonly used.

Arrow notation
Arrow notation defines the rule of a function inline, without requiring a name to be given to the function. For example,  is the function which takes a real number as input and outputs that number plus 1.

The domain and codomain can also be explicitly stated, for example:

This defines a function  from the integers to the integers that returns the square of its input.

As a common application of the arrow notation, suppose  is a function in two variables, and we want to refer to a partially applied function  produced by fixing the second argument to the value  without introducing a new function name.  The map in question could be denoted  using the arrow notation. The expression  (read: "the map taking  to ") represents this new function with just one argument, whereas the expression  refers to the value of the function  at the

Index notation

Index notation is often used instead of functional notation. That is, instead of writing , one writes 

This is typically the case for functions whose domain is the set of the natural numbers. Such a function is called a sequence, and, in this case the element  is called the th element of the sequence.

The index notation is also often used for distinguishing some variables called parameters from the "true variables". In fact, parameters are specific variables that are considered as being fixed during the study of a problem.  For example, the map  (see above) would be denoted  using index notation, if we define the collection of maps  by the formula  for all .

Dot notation

In the notation

the symbol  does not represent any value, it is simply a placeholder meaning that, if  is replaced by any value on the left of the arrow, it should be replaced by the same value on the right of the arrow. Therefore,  may be replaced by any symbol, often an interpunct "".

For example,  may stand for the function , and  may stand for a function defined by an integral with variable upper bound: .

Specialized notations 
There are other, specialized notations for functions in sub-disciplines of mathematics.  For example, in linear algebra and functional analysis, linear forms and the vectors they act upon are denoted using a dual pair to show the underlying duality.  This is similar to the use of bra–ket notation in quantum mechanics.  In logic and the theory of computation, the function notation of lambda calculus is used to explicitly express the basic notions of function abstraction and application.  In category theory and homological algebra, networks of functions are described in terms of how they and their compositions commute with each other using commutative diagrams that extend and generalize the arrow notation for functions described above.

Other terms 

A function is often also called a map or a mapping, but some authors make a distinction between the term "map" and "function". For example, the term "map" is often reserved for a "function" with some sort of special structure (e.g. maps of manifolds). Some authors reserve the word mapping for the case where the structure of the codomain belongs explicitly to the definition of the function.

Some authors, such as Serge Lang, use "function" only to refer to maps for which the codomain is a subset of the real or complex numbers, and use the term mapping for more general functions.

In the theory of dynamical systems, a map denotes an evolution function used to create discrete dynamical systems. See also Poincaré map.

Whichever definition of map is used, related terms like domain, codomain, injective, continuous have the same meaning as for a function.

Specifying a function
Sometimes, a theorem or an axiom asserts the existence of a function having some properties, without describing it more precisely. Often, the specification or description is referred to as the definition of the function .

By listing function values
On a finite set, a function may be defined by listing the elements of the codomain that are associated to the elements of the domain. For example, if , then one can define a function  by

By a formula
Functions are often defined by a formula that describes a combination of arithmetic operations and previously defined functions; such a formula allows computing the value of the function from the value of any element of the domain.

When a function is defined this way, the determination of its domain is sometimes difficult. If the formula that defines the function contains divisions, the values of the variable for which a denominator is zero must be excluded from the domain; thus, for a complicated function, the determination of the domain passes through the computation of the zeros of auxiliary functions.

For example,  defines a function  whose domain is  because  is always positive if  is a real number. On the other hand,  defines a function from the reals to the reals whose domain is reduced to the interval . (In old texts, such a domain was called the domain of definition of the function.)

Functions are often classified by the nature of formulas that define them:
A quadratic function is a function that may be written  where  are constants.
More generally, a polynomial function is a function that can be defined by a formula involving only additions, subtractions, multiplications, and exponentiation to nonnegative integers. For example,  and 
An algebraic function is the same, with th roots and roots of polynomials also allowed.
An elementary function is the same, with logarithms and exponential functions allowed.

Inverse and implicit functions
For example, the natural logarithm is a bijective function from the positive real numbers to the real numbers. It thus has an inverse, called the exponential function, that maps the real numbers onto the positive numbers.

The inverse trigonometric functions are defined this way. For example, the cosine function induces, by restriction, a bijection from the interval  onto the interval , and its inverse function, called arccosine, maps  onto . The other inverse trigonometric functions are defined similarly.

For example, the equation of the unit circle  defines a relation on real numbers. For , these two values become both equal to 0.

The Bring radical cannot be expressed in terms of the four arithmetic operations and th roots.

The implicit function theorem provides mild differentiability conditions for existence and uniqueness of an implicit function in the neighborhood of a point.

Using differential calculus

Many functions can be defined as the antiderivative of another function. Another common example is the error function.

More generally, many functions, including most special functions, can be defined as solutions of differential equations.

Power series can be used to define functions on the domain in which they converge. However, as the coefficients of a series are quite arbitrary, a function that is the sum of a convergent series is generally defined otherwise, and the sequence of the coefficients is the result of some computation based on another definition. Then, the power series can be used to enlarge the domain of the function. Typically, if a function for a real variable is the sum of its Taylor series in some interval, this power series allows immediately enlarging the domain to a subset of the complex numbers, the disc of convergence of the series. Then analytic continuation allows enlarging further the domain for including almost the whole complex plane. This process is the method that is generally used for defining the logarithm, the exponential and the trigonometric functions of a complex number.

By recurrence 

Functions whose domain are the nonnegative integers, known as sequences, are often defined by recurrence relations.

The factorial function on the nonnegative integers is a basic example, as it can be defined by the recurrence relation

and the initial condition

Representing a function

A graph is commonly used to give an intuitive picture of a function.  As an example of how a graph helps to understand a function, it is easy to see from its graph whether a function is increasing or decreasing. Some functions may also be represented by bar charts.

Graphs and plots

Given a function  its graph is, formally, the set

Parts of this may create a plot that represents (parts of) the function. The use of plots is so ubiquitous that they too are called the graph of the function. Graphic representations of functions are also possible in other coordinate systems. For example, the graph of the square function

consisting of all points with coordinates  for  yields, when depicted in Cartesian coordinates, the well known parabola. If the same quadratic function  with the same formal graph, consisting of pairs of numbers, is plotted instead in polar coordinates  the plot obtained is Fermat's spiral.

Tables

A function can be represented as a table of values.  If the domain of a function is finite, then the function can be completely specified in this way.  For example, the multiplication function  defined as  can be represented by the familiar multiplication table

On the other hand, if a function's domain is continuous, a table can give the values of the function at specific values of the domain.  If an intermediate value is needed, interpolation can be used to estimate the value of the function.  For example, a portion of a table for the sine function might be given as follows, with values rounded to 6 decimal places:

Before the advent of handheld calculators and personal computers, such tables were often compiled and published for functions such as logarithms and trigonometric functions.

Bar chart

Bar charts are often used for representing functions whose domain is a finite set, the natural numbers, or the integers.

General properties

This section describes general properties of functions, that are independent of specific properties of the domain and the codomain.

Standard functions
There are a number of standard functions that occur frequently:
The graph of an empty function is the empty set. The existence of empty functions is needed both for the coherency of the theory and for avoiding exceptions concerning the empty set in many statements. Under the usual set-theoretic definition of a function as an ordered triplet (or equivalent ones), there is exactly one empty function for each set, thus the empty function  is not equal to  if and only if , although their graph are both the empty set.
This is a surjection (see below) unless  is the empty set.

Function composition

In the notation the function that is applied first is always written on the right.

The composition  is an operation on functions that is defined only if the codomain of the first function is the domain of the second one. Even when both  and  satisfy these conditions, the composition is not necessarily commutative, that is, the functions  and  need not be equal, but may deliver different values for the same argument.

Thus, one writes

That is, if  is a function with domain , and codomain , one has

Image and preimage

On the other hand, the inverse image or preimage under  of an element  of the codomain  is the set of all elements of the domain  whose images under  equal .

For example, the preimage of  under the square function is the set .

By definition of a function, the image of an element  of the domain is always a single element of the codomain. However, the preimage  of an element  of the codomain may be empty or contain any number of elements. For example, if  is the function from the integers to themselves that maps every integer to 0, then .

 
 
 
 
 
 

This is not a problem, as these sets are equal. The notation  and  may be ambiguous in the case of sets that contain some subsets as elements, such as  In this case, some care may be needed, for example, by using square brackets  for images and preimages of subsets and ordinary parentheses for images and preimages of elements.

Injective, surjective and bijective functions
Let  be a function.

Equivalently,  is injective if and only if, for any  the preimage  contains at most one element. An empty function is always injective. If  is not the empty set, then  is injective if and only if there exists a function  such that  that is, if  has a left inverse.

The function  is surjective (or onto, or is a surjection) if its range  equals its codomain , that is, if, for each element  of the codomain, there exists some element  of the domain such that  (in other words, the preimage  of every  is nonempty). If, as usual in modern mathematics, the axiom of choice is assumed, then  is surjective if and only if there exists a function  such that  that is, if  has a right inverse. The axiom of choice is needed, because, if  is surjective, one defines  by  where  is an arbitrarily chosen element of 

The function  is bijective (or is a bijection or a one-to-one correspondence) if it is both injective and surjective. That is,  is bijective if, for any  the preimage  contains exactly one element.

"One-to-one" and "onto" are terms that were more common in the older English language literature; "injective", "surjective", and "bijective" were originally coined as French words in the second quarter of the 20th century by the Bourbaki group and imported into English. As a word of caution, "a one-to-one function" is one that is injective, while a "one-to-one correspondence" refers to a bijective function. In a complicated reasoning, the one letter difference can easily be missed. Due to the confusing nature of this older terminology, these terms have declined in popularity relative to the Bourbakian terms, which have also the advantage of being more symmetrical.

Restriction and extension

For example, the cosine function is injective when restricted to the interval .

Function restriction may also be used for "gluing" functions together. Then this defines a unique function  such that  for all . This is the way that functions on manifolds are defined.

A typical use of this concept is the process of analytic continuation, that allows extending functions whose domain is a small part of the complex plane to functions whose domain is almost the whole complex plane.

Here is another classical example of a function extension that is encountered when studying homographies of the real line. A homography is a function  such that .

Multivariate function 

A multivariate function, or function of several variables is a function that depends on several arguments. Such functions are commonly encountered. For example, the position of a car on a road is a function of the time travelled and its average speed.

More formally, a function of  variables is a function whose domain is a set of -tuples.
For example, multiplication of integers is a function of two variables, or bivariate function, whose domain is the set of all pairs (2-tuples) of integers, and whose codomain is the set of integers. The same is true for every binary operation. More generally, every mathematical operation is defined as a multivariate function.

Therefore, a function of  variables is a function

where the domain  has the form

When using function notation, one usually omits the parentheses surrounding tuples, writing  instead of 

It is common to also consider functions whose codomain is a product of sets.

The codomain may also be a vector space. In this case, one talks of a vector-valued function. If the domain is contained in a Euclidean space, or more generally a manifold, a vector-valued function is often called a vector field.

In calculus

The idea of function, starting in the 17th century, was fundamental to the new infinitesimal calculus. At that time, only real-valued functions of a real variable were considered, and all functions were assumed to be smooth. But the definition was soon extended to functions of several variables and to functions of a complex variable. In the second half of the 19th century, the mathematically rigorous definition of a function was introduced, and functions with arbitrary domains and codomains were defined.

Functions are now used throughout all areas of mathematics. In introductory calculus, when the word function is used without qualification, it means a real-valued function of a single real variable. The more general definition of a function is usually introduced to second or third year college students with STEM majors, and in their senior year they are introduced to calculus in a larger, more rigorous setting in courses such as real analysis and complex analysis.

Real function

A real function is a real-valued function of a real variable, that is, a function whose codomain is the field of real numbers and whose domain is a set of real numbers that contains an interval. In this section, these functions are simply called functions.

The functions that are most commonly considered in mathematics and its applications have some regularity, that is they are continuous, differentiable, and even analytic. This regularity insures that these functions can be visualized by their graphs. In this section, all functions are differentiable in some interval.

The quotient of two functions is defined similarly by

The polynomial functions are defined by polynomials, and their domain is the whole set of real numbers. They include constant functions, linear functions and quadratic functions. Rational functions are quotients of two polynomial functions, and their domain is the real numbers with a finite number of them removed to avoid division by zero. The simplest rational function is the function  whose graph is a hyperbola, and whose domain is the whole real line except for 0.

The derivative of a real differentiable function is a real function. An antiderivative of a continuous real function is a real function that has the original function as a derivative. For example, the function  is continuous, and even differentiable, on the positive real numbers.

If the function is differentiable in the interval, it is monotonic if the sign of the derivative is constant in the interval. If a real function  is monotonic in an interval , it has an inverse function, which is a real function with domain  and image . This is how inverse trigonometric functions are defined in terms of trigonometric functions, where the trigonometric functions are monotonic. Another example: the natural logarithm is monotonic on the positive real numbers, and its image is the whole real line; therefore it has an inverse function that is a bijection between the real numbers and the positive real numbers. This inverse is the exponential function.

Many other real functions are defined either by the implicit function theorem (the inverse function is a particular instance) or as solutions of differential equations. For example, the sine and the cosine functions are the solutions of the linear differential equation

such that

Vector-valued function

When the elements of the codomain of a function are vectors, the function is said to be a vector-valued function. These functions are particularly useful in applications, for example modeling physical properties. For example, the function that associates to each point of a fluid its velocity vector is a vector-valued function.

These vector-valued functions are given the name vector fields.

Function space

In mathematical analysis, and more specifically in functional analysis, a function space is a set of scalar-valued or vector-valued functions, which share a specific property and form a topological vector space. For example, the real smooth functions with a compact support (that is, they are zero outside some compact set) form a function space that is at the basis of the theory of distributions.

Function spaces play a fundamental role in advanced mathematical analysis, by allowing the use of their algebraic and topological properties for studying properties of functions. For example, all theorems of existence and uniqueness of solutions of ordinary or partial differential equations result of the study of function spaces.

Multi-valued functions

Several methods for specifying functions of real or complex variables start from a local definition of the function at a point or on a neighbourhood of a point, and then extend by continuity the function to a much larger domain. Frequently, for a starting point  there are several possible starting values for the function.

For example, in defining the square root as the inverse function of the square function, for any positive real number  there are two choices for the value of the square root, one of which is positive and denoted  and another which is negative and denoted  These choices define two continuous functions, both having the nonnegative real numbers as a domain, and having either the nonnegative or the nonpositive real numbers as images. When looking at the graphs of these functions, one can see that, together, they form a single smooth curve. It is therefore often useful to consider these two square root functions as a single function that has two values for positive , one value for 0 and no value for negative .

In the preceding example, one choice, the positive square root, is more natural than the other. This is not the case in general.

Usefulness of the concept of multi-valued functions is clearer when considering complex functions, typically analytic functions. The domain to which a complex function may be extended by analytic continuation generally consists of almost the whole complex plane. However, when extending the domain through two different paths, one often gets different values. For example, when extending the domain of the square root function, along a path of complex numbers with positive imaginary parts, one gets  for the square root of −1; while, when extending through complex numbers with negative imaginary parts, one gets . There are generally two ways of solving the problem. One may define a function that is not continuous along some curve, called a branch cut. Such a function is called the principal value of the function. The other way is to consider that one has a multi-valued function, which is analytic everywhere except for isolated singularities, but whose value may "jump" if one follows a closed loop around a singularity. This jump is called the monodromy.

In the foundations of mathematics and set theory

The definition of a function that is given in this article requires the concept of set, since the domain and the codomain of a function must be a set. This is not a problem in usual mathematics, as it is generally not difficult to consider only functions whose domain and codomain are sets, which are well defined, even if the domain is not explicitly defined. However, it is sometimes useful to consider more general functions.

For example, the singleton set may be considered as a function  Its domain would include all sets, and therefore would not be a set. In usual mathematics, one avoids this kind of problem by specifying a domain, which means that one has many singleton functions. However, when establishing foundations of mathematics, one may have to use functions whose domain, codomain or both are not specified, and some authors, often logicians, give precise definition for these weakly specified functions.

These generalized functions may be critical in the development of a formalization of the foundations of mathematics. For example, Von Neumann–Bernays–Gödel set theory, is an extension of the set theory in which the collection of all sets is a class.

In computer science 

In computer programming, a function is, in general, a piece of a computer program, which implements the abstract concept of function. That is, it is a program unit that produces an output for each input. However, in many programming languages every subroutine is called a function, even when there is no output, and when the functionality consists simply of modifying some data in the computer memory.

Functional programming is the programming paradigm consisting of building programs by using only subroutines that behave like mathematical functions. For example, if_then_else is a function that takes three functions as arguments, and, depending on the result of the first function (true or false), returns the result of either the second or the third function. An important advantage of functional programming is that it makes easier program proofs, as being based on a well founded theory, the lambda calculus (see below).

Except for computer-language terminology, "function" has the usual mathematical meaning in computer science. In this area, a property of major interest is the computability of a function. For giving a precise meaning to this concept, and to the related concept of algorithm, several models of computation have been introduced, the old ones being general recursive functions, lambda calculus and Turing machine. The fundamental theorem of computability theory is that these three models of computation define the same set of computable functions, and that all the other models of computation that have ever been proposed define the same set of computable functions or a smaller one. The Church–Turing thesis is the claim that every philosophically acceptable definition of a computable function defines also the same functions.

General recursive functions are partial functions from integers to integers that can be defined from 
 constant functions, 
 successor, and
 projection functions 
via the operators
 composition, 
 primitive recursion, and 
 minimization. 
Although defined only for functions from integers to integers, they can model any computable function as a consequence of the following properties:
 a computation is the manipulation of finite sequences of symbols (digits of numbers, formulas, ...),
 every sequence of symbols may be coded as a sequence of bits,
 a bit sequence can be interpreted as the binary representation of an integer.

Lambda calculus is a theory that defines computable functions without using set theory, and is the theoretical background of functional programming. It consists of terms that are either variables, function definitions (-terms), or applications of functions to terms. Terms are manipulated through some rules, (the -equivalence, the -reduction, and the -conversion), which are the axioms of the theory and may be interpreted as rules of computation.

In its original form, lambda calculus does not include the concepts of domain and codomain of a function. Roughly speaking, they have been introduced in the theory under the name of type in typed lambda calculus. Most kinds of typed lambda calculi can define fewer functions than untyped lambda calculus.

See also

Subpages

 List of types of functions
 List of functions
 Function fitting
 Implicit function

Generalizations

 Higher-order function
 Homomorphism
 Morphism
 Microfunction
 Distribution
 Functor

Related topics

 Associative array
 Closed-form expression
 Elementary function
 Functional
 Functional decomposition
 Functional predicate
 Functional programming
 Parametric equation
 Set function
 Simple function

Notes

References

Sources

Further reading
 
 
 
 
 
 
 
  An approachable and diverting historical presentation.

External links

 
 The Wolfram Functions Site gives formulae and visualizations of many mathematical functions.
 NIST Digital Library of Mathematical Functions

 
Basic concepts in set theory
Elementary mathematics